The Pori urban area is the 8th largest taajama in Finland. It has 83,206 inhabitants as of 2021. The urban area includes parts of City of Pori, towns of Ulvila and Harjavalta and municipality of Nakkila.

See also 
 List of urban areas in Finland by population

References 

Geography of Pori
Ulvila
Nakkila
Harjavalta